Don Archibald (19 September 1906 – 10 May 1968) was a Canadian soccer player who earned four caps for the national team in 1927, scoring three goals in the process.

External links

1906 births
1968 deaths
Canada men's international soccer players
Canadian soccer players
Canadian people of Scottish descent
Association football forwards